Eight Is Enough is an American television comedy-drama series that ran on ABC from March 15, 1977, until May 23, 1981. The show was modeled on the life of syndicated newspaper columnist Tom Braden, a real-life parent with eight children, who wrote a book by the same title.

Synopsis
The show centers on a Sacramento, California, family with eight children (from oldest to youngest: David, Mary, Joanie, Susan, Nancy, Elizabeth, Tommy, and Nicholas). The father, Tom Bradford (based on Tom Braden, played by Dick Van Patten), is a newspaper columnist for the fictional Sacramento Register. His wife, Joan (based on Joan Braden, played by Diana Hyland), was a homemaker and took care of the children.

In early 1977, Hyland was diagnosed with breast cancer, undergoing a mastectomy when doctors discovered the cancer had metastasized. During filming her health suddenly deteriorated, and Hyland died on March 27, 1977, having filmed only four episodes. As a result, her character's death was written into the second season of the series.

The second season begins in the fall of 1977 with Tom as a widower. He eventually meets and falls in love with Sandra Sue "Abby" Abbott (Betty Buckley), a widowed schoolteacher who comes to the house to tutor Tommy after he breaks his leg in a football game. Abby and Tom marry in one of the series' TV movie broadcasts on November 9, 1977. The role went to Buckley after being approved by network chief Brandon Tartikoff, who felt that the character of Miss Collins, the sympathetic high school gym teacher she had played in the 1976 film Carrie, would translate seamlessly to the series.

In the fourth season, in another of the series' TV movie broadcasts in September 1979, both David and Susan get married in a double wedding. As the series progresses, Abby receives her Ph.D. in education and starts a job counseling students at the local high school; oldest daughter Mary becomes a medical doctor; second-youngest son Tommy becomes a singer in a rock-and-roll band.

Cast and characters

Main
Dick Van Patten as Thomas "Tom" Bradford Sr
Diana Hyland as Joan Wells Bradford (season 1)
Betty Buckley as Sandra Sue "Abby" Mitchell Abbott Bradford (seasons 2–5)
Grant Goodeve as David Bradford
Lani O'Grady as Mary Bradford 
Laurie Walters as Joan "Joanie" Bradford 
Susan Richardson as Susan Bradford Stockwell
Dianne Kay as Nancy Bradford 
Connie Newton/Needham as Elizabeth Bradford (switched to new married name, Needham, at start of season 4)
Willie Aames as Thomas "Tommy " Bradford, Jr.
Adam Rich as Nicholas Bradford

In the pilot, the role of David was played by Mark Hamill, Nancy was played by Kimberly Beck, and Tommy was played by Chris English. When ABC screened the pilot, they were unhappy with the performances of Beck and English, who were let go and replaced, respectively, by Dianne Kay and Willie Aames. Hamill sought to get out of his five-year contract on Eight Is Enough to take the opportunity to star in George Lucas' Star Wars; Lorimar Productions granted his request and the role was re-cast with Grant Goodeve.

Recurring
Jennifer Darling as Donna (1977–1981)
Michael Thoma as Dr. Greg Maxwell (1977–1981)
Virginia Vincent as Daisy Maxwell (1977–1981)
Janis Paige as Vivian "Auntie V" Bradford (1977–1980)
Joan Prather as Janet McArthur Bradford (1979–1981)
Brian Patrick Clarke as Merle "The Pearl" Stockwell (1979–1981)
Ralph Macchio as Jeremy Andretti (1980–1981)
Michael Goodrow as Ernie Fields (1979–1981)
James Karen as Eliot Randolph (1978–1981)
Michele Greene as Jill (1980–1981)

Production
The show was developed by writer William Blinn and was a Lorimar Production. It was originally distributed by Worldvision Enterprises. For the first three years the show filmed interior scenes at The Burbank Studios now known as the Warner Bros. Ranch. From the fourth season the show filmed interiors at MGM Studios in Culver City.

The home featured in the exterior shots was on Chiquita St, near Lankershim Boulevard in Los Angeles. The house has since been demolished and replaced. The interiors for seasons one through three were filmed on Soundstage 9 The Burbank Studio. Seasons four and five were shot on two stages at MGM in Culver City.

The show's team of producers included Robert L. Jacks, Gary Adelson, Greg Strangis, and Phil Fehrle. Executive producers were Lee Rich and Philip Capice.

As a production of the Lorimar stable, who were concurrently producing CBS's The Waltons, writers were often contracted by the producers and were shared between both programs. (Waltons co-star Will Geer also made an Eight Is Enough guest appearance during season 2.) Regular writers included Peter Lefcourt, the writing teams of Gwen Bagni and Paul Dubov, Rod Peterson and Claire Whittaker, Bill Nuss and Dusty Kay, Nick Thiel and David Braff, J. Miyoko Hensley and Steven Hensley, Bruce Shelly, Sandra Kay Siegel, Gil Grant, Karen I. Hall, and Hindi Brooks, who soon became the show's long-time story editor. In-house directors included Philip Leacock, Harry Harris, and Irving J. Moore. As an in-joke, the character name of one of Nicholas Bradford's best friends was Irving Julius Moore, a nod to the director of the same name whose middle name was, in fact, Joseph.

Music

Theme
For the show's first two seasons, an upbeat instrumental piece written by Fred Werner was used as the show's opening theme. Beginning with the show's third season, this was replaced by a slowed-down vocal theme titled "Eight Is Enough," which was sung by series co-star Grant Goodeve. The song had music by Lee Holdridge and lyrics by Molly-Ann Leikin, and was first heard in a longer arrangement on the last episode of the second season titled "Who's on First?", which was also performed by Goodeve.

Score
Early episodes had instrumental music by Fred Werner and Alexander Courage, but the show's real musical stamp came from composer Earle Hagen, who had a knack of composing memorable cues as he had previously been the in-house composer on The Andy Griffith Show. He composed a love theme for Tom and Abby, a theme that permeated the show in various incarnations throughout the remainder of the series. Some later episodes were scored by John Beal and Miles Goodman.

Back-to-back industry strikes in the show's last seasons affected the show's score, with both the 1980 SAG actors' strike and 1981 writers' strike forcing cost-cutting measures. Some of the later episodes were tracked with a combination of uncredited library music and original music by Hagen, Beal, and Goodman.

Reception and cancellation
The series jump-started acting careers for several of its young stars. It cemented teen idol status for Grant Goodeve (David), Willie Aames (Tommy), and Ralph Macchio, who played Abby's orphaned nephew Jeremy later in the show's last season. Aames went on to star with Scott Baio in Charles in Charge. Goodeve started a minor singing career, following his rendition of the show's theme song (see Theme section) and initially hosted HGTV's If Walls Could Talk. Macchio gained the most fame in feature films such as The Karate Kid and its sequels, as well as My Cousin Vinny.

After the end of the show's fifth season (112 one-hour episodes), production costs and declining ratings caused the show to be cancelled, along with seven other shows that season (including The Waltons). Variety's headline on the cancellation stated, "Eight Shows In, Eight Shows Out". In a 2000 episode of E! True Hollywood Story, Dick Van Patten stated that no one contacted him to inform him of the cancellation. Instead, he read about it in a newspaper.

The series had two reunion movies on NBC. In Eight Is Enough: A Family Reunion on October 18, 1987, Mary Frann replaced Betty Buckley as Abby; Buckley had been filming Frantic during its production. This was followed by An Eight Is Enough Wedding on October 15, 1989, this time with Sandy Faison as Abby. Both movies aired opposite Game 2 of the World Series on ABC.

Nielsen Ratings

1976–1977 — #23
1977–1978 — #12
1978–1979 — #11
1979–1980 — #12
1980–1981 — Not in Top 30

Series overview

Episodes

Season 1 (1977)

Season 2 (1977–78)

Season 3 (1978–79)

Season 4 (1979–80)

Season 5 (1980–81)

Post-series movies

Syndication
Reruns of all 112 episodes of Eight Is Enough have aired sporadically since the show's syndication debut in September 1982. The show aired on FX from 1994 to 1997, on PAX in 1998, and as part of a 50th-anniversary Warner Bros. marathon on TV Land in 2005. Eight Is Enough also aired on the Chicago-based MeTV and MeToo, a sister station of MeTV, from 2008 to 2010 before MeTV spread to other markets around the U.S.

During its network run, the show was distributed by Worldvision Enterprises (also internationally in rebroadcasts), and later by Lorimar-Telepictures. All syndication rights are now held by (Lorimar successor) Warner Bros. Television.

International
In Italy, RAI public networks aired the first season of Eight Is Enough under the title Otto Bastano in 1978, the literal Italian translation of the original title. The remaining seasons were aired in the 1980s on Retequattro, a commercial network from Fininvest (now Mediaset), under the title La Famiglia Bradford. The Italian version excludes the laugh track.

The French version, Huit, ça suffit!, which excludes the laugh track, was successful in the 1980s in France and Quebec, and with the francophone Canadian audience in general.

In Spain during the same period, Con Ocho Basta (Spanish for "Eight Is Enough") ran in public network RTVE's Friday night line-up.

In the Philippines, Eight Is Enough aired on GMA 7 from 1978 to 1981.

Home media
On April 17, 2012, Warner Home Video released the complete first season of Eight Is Enough on DVD in Region 1. The release includes the pilot episode (featuring Mark Hamill in the role of eldest son David) and a cast reunion special. Several of the episodes have the wrong end credits, and the Lorimar Productions logo has also been edited out of the end credits.

On November 13, 2012, Warner Bros. released season 2, parts one and two on DVD-R via their Warner Archive Collection. These are Manufacture-on-Demand (MOD) releases and are available through Warner's online store and Amazon.com. Season 3, Parts One and Two were released on April 30, 2013.

Season 4, parts one and two were released on August 13, 2013. The fifth and final season was released on March 11, 2014.

See also
 The Brady Bunch (1969)
 Just the Ten of Us (1988)

References

External links

 (1987 reunion movie)
 (1989 reunion movie)

1977 American television series debuts
1981 American television series endings
1970s American comedy-drama television series
1980s American comedy-drama television series
American Broadcasting Company original programming
English-language television shows
Television series about families
Television series about widowhood
Television series by Lorimar Television
Television shows set in Sacramento, California